Lincoln County High School can refer to any of the following United States high schools:

Lincoln County High School (Georgia) in Lincolnton, Georgia
Lincoln County High School (Kentucky) in Stanford, Kentucky
Lincoln County High School (Montana) in Eureka, Montana
Lincoln County High School (Nevada) in Panaca, Nevada
Lincoln County High School (Tennessee) in Fayetteville, Tennessee
Lincoln County High School (West Virginia) in West Hamlin, West Virginia